Cloister Inn is one of the undergraduate eating clubs at Princeton University in Princeton, New Jersey, United States.

Founded in 1912, Cloister occupies a neo-Gothic building on Prospect Avenue, between Cap and Gown Club and Charter Club. Cloister closed temporarily in 1972, becoming open to all Princeton alumni, before reopening as an undergraduate club in 1977.  The club is "sign-in", meaning that it selects its members from a lottery process rather than the bicker process used by several of the eating clubs. Cloister typically attracts an athletic crowd and its members often include a number of Olympians. The official motto of the club is “Where everybody knows your name”.

History 
Cloister Inn was founded in 1912. The present building was constructed in 1924.

It was designed by architects R.H. Scannell and Charles Lewis Bowman  NRHP

Cloister received mention in Ian Caldwell and Dustin Thomason's 2004 bestselling novel The Rule of Four. Caldwell, a 1998 graduate of Princeton, was a member of Cloister.

Notable alumni

Business 
 Robert Briskman '54, co-founder of Sirius Satellite Radio and Technical Executive of Sirius XM Radio
 Tad Smith '87, chief executive of Sotheby's

Literature and the arts 
 Craig Mazin '92, screenwriter and director 
 Ian Caldwell '98, co-author of the bestselling novel The Rule of Four, which was set at Princeton and includes several scenes that take place at Cloister
 Nicholas Confessore '98, political correspondent for The New York Times

Politics, government, and public affairs 
 Anne-Marie Slaughter '80, president and CEO of the New America Foundation and former Director of Policy Planning for the U.S. State Department
 Eliot Spitzer '81, former New York governor
 Elena Kagan '81, United States Supreme Court justice
Nan Hayworth '81, former U.S. Representative for New York's 19th congressional district
 Chris Lu '88, United States Deputy Secretary of Labor
 Nuala O'Connor '89, current president of the Center for Democracy and Technology and inaugural Chief Privacy Officer for the US Department of Homeland Security
 Charles W. Yost '28, U.S. Ambassador to Laos, Syria, Morocco, and U.S. Ambassador to the United Nations

Sport 
 Frank Anger '61, member of the United States team in Fencing at the Summer Olympics in Tokyo in 1962
 Derek Bouchard-Hall '92, former professional cyclist, competitor in the men's team pursuit in Cycling at the 2000 Summer Olympics, and current CEO and president of USA Cycling
Danika Holbrook '95, competitor for the United States in Rowing at the 2004 Summer Olympics - Women's quadruple sculls
 Morgan Crooks '98, competitor for Canada in Rowing at the 2000 Summer Olympics
 Chris Ahrens '98, gold medalist in the Men's Eights event in Rowing at the 2004 Summer Olympics
 Thomas Herschmiller '01, silver medalist for Canada in Rowing at the 2004 Summer Olympics
 Paul Teti '01, three-time member of the United States Olympic rowing team
 Lia Pernell '03, competitor for the United States in Rowing at the 2008 Summer Olympics
 Juan Pablo Valdivieso '04, two-time member of Peru's Olympic swimming team
 Samuel Loch '06, Australian rower who competed in the 2008 Summer Olympics and 2012 Summer Olympics
 Steven Coppola '06, bronze medalist for the United States in Rowing at the 2008 Summer Olympics - Men's eight
 Caroline Lind '06, two-time Olympic gold medalist for the United States in Women's rowing
 Genevra Stone '07, six-time winner of the women's championship singles event at Head of the Charles Regatta and competitor for the United States in Rowing at the 2012 Summer Olympics - Women's single sculls
 Glenn Ochal '08, bronze medalist for the United States in Rowing at the 2012 Summer Olympics - Men's coxless four
 Douglas Lennox-Silva '09, swimmer who represented Puerto Rico in the 2008 Summer Olympics
 Grant Wentworth '09, record holder in open water swimming for the solo swim from Cape Cod to Nantucket
 Sara Hendershot '10, representative of the United States in Rowing at the 2012 Summer Olympics
 Robin Prendes '11, representative of the United States in Rowing at the 2012 Summer Olympics in the men's coxless four
 Bryan Tay '12, Singapore's sole representative in men's Swimming at the 2008 Summer Olympics
 Susie Scanlan '14, American epee fencer who won a bronze medal in the 2012 Summer Olympics

References

External links
 Homepage

Eating clubs at Princeton University
Historic district contributing properties in Mercer County, New Jersey